Fulke Greville may refer to:
Fulke Greville, 4th Baron Willoughby de Broke (c.1526–1606)
Sir Fulke Greville (1536–1606)
Fulke Greville, 1st Baron Brooke (1554–1628), Elizabethan poet, dramatist and statesman
Fulke Greville, 5th Baron Brooke, British Member of Parliament for Warwick, father of Francis Greville
Fulke Greville, 6th Baron Brooke (1693–1711), son of English politician Francis Greville
Fulke Greville (1717–1806), member of Parliament for Monmouth Boroughs and British ambassador to Bavaria. Son of William, 7th Baron Brooke, and nephew of Fulke, the 6th Baron. 
Robert Fulke Greville (1751–1824, also recorded as R. Fulke Greville), army officer, member of Parliament, and equerry to King George III. Son of Francis, 1st Earl Warwick, and great-grandson of Fulke, 6th Baron Brooke. 
Fulke Greville-Nugent, 1st Baron Greville (1821–1883), Irish politician, member of Parliament for County Longford. Great-grandson of Fulke the ambassador.